TGI Fridays (operating in the UK as FRIDAYS) is an American restaurant chain focusing on primarily American cuisine and casual dining. The restaurant's founder said the name stood for "Thank God It's Friday", although  some television commercials for the chain have also made use of the phrase, "Thank Goodness It's Friday". TGI Fridays operates over 869 locations in 55 countries, including 292 in the United States.

History
 

Alan Stillman opened the first TGI Fridays restaurant in 1965, in New York. He lived on 63rd Street between First and York, in a neighborhood with many airline stewardesses, fashion models, secretaries, and other young, single people on the East Side of Manhattan near the Queensboro Bridge on the corner of East 63rd and 1st Avenue, and hoped that opening a bar would help him meet women. At the time, Stillman's choices for socializing were non-public cocktail parties or "guys' beer-drinking hangout" bars that women usually would not visit; he recalled that "there was no public place for people between, say, twenty-three to thirty-seven years old, to meet." He sought to recreate the comfortable cocktail party atmosphere in public despite having no experience in the restaurant business.

With $5,000 of his own money and $5,000 borrowed from his mother, Stillman purchased a bar he often visited, The Good Tavern at the corner of 63rd Street and First Avenue, and renamed it TGI Fridays after the expression "Thank God it's Friday!" from his years at Bucknell University. The new restaurant, which opened on March 15, 1965, served standard American cuisine, bar food, and alcoholic beverages, but emphasized food quality and preparation. The exterior featured a red-and-white striped awning and blue paint; the Gay Nineties interior included American-made Tiffany-style lamps, mostly by the Somers family, wooden floors, Bentwood chairs, and striped tablecloths; and the bar area added brass rails and stained glass. The employees were young men: handsome jocks in form-fitting red-and-white striped soccer shirts, and every time someone had a birthday, the entire restaurant crew came around with a cake and sang TGI Fridays' traditional birthday song. Footage of interviews with patrons from this TGI Fridays was featured in Robert Downey Sr.'s film No More Excuses (1968). The first location closed in 1994 and became a British pub called "Baker Street"; the brass rails are still there.

Although Malachy McCourt's nearby eponymous bar preceded TGI Fridays and Stillman credited the media for creating the term, he had unintentionally created one of the first singles bars. It benefited from the near-simultaneous availability of the birth-control pill and Betty Friedan's book The Feminine Mystique:

TGI Fridays was one of the first to use promotions such as ladies' night, and Stillman achieved his hopes of meeting women; "Have you seen the movie Cocktail? Tom Cruise played me!...Why do girls want to date the bartender? To this day, I'm not sure that I get it." He and the restaurant benefited from its location—according to Stillman, 480 stewardesses lived in the apartment building next door—and received publicity in national magazines. TGI Fridays became so popular that it had to install ropes to create an area for those waiting in line, also unusual at the time for a restaurant. A competitor, Maxwell's Plum, opened across the street, and others soon followed.

With fellow Bucknell graduate Ben Benson, Stillman opened other restaurants, including Tuesday's, Thursday's, Wednesday's, and Ice Cream Sunday's. Franchising of TGI Fridays began two years after the Manhattan location opened, in Memphis, Tennessee's Overton Square district; that location has since closed. In 1971, Daniel R. Scoggin acquired the rights to eight major Midwest cities. In 1972, he opened with the first of a new prototype in Dallas.  The raised square bar and multilevel dining became the company standard. Dallas doubled the sales and tripled profits of TGI Fridays previous best. Families began visiting the new suburban locations during the day for casual food; "it took six or seven years, but T.G.I. Fridays became a very different animal", Stillman said. Attracted by this performance, he merged into the Dallas franchise forming TGI Fridays, Inc., and Scoggin was the CEO for the next 15 years. Scoggin is credited with the then-new 200 seat prototype as well as many of the TGI Fridays innovations including a large from scratch menu, potato skins, bartender Olympics, and frozen drinks.

The company was sold to Carlson Companies in 1975. With this sale, Stillman and the original investors departed. Stillman kept the original location, and now married, founded Smith & Wollensky in 1977 with Benson. Scoggin continued as CEO on an earn-out contract and finalized his sale in 1980.

When the sale was finalized, Scoggin signed a new contract to continue as the company's CEO. When the company was passing through the 100-store mark, it issued an initial public offering in 1983 with Goldman Sachs. Scoggin developed the first international franchise and the template for future international development. The first restaurant was opened in the UK with Whitbread PLC. Prior to Scoggin's departure in 1986, the company was positioned to appeal to a broader consumer profile. Alcohol consumption was de-emphasized, and quality was emphasized over quantity.

The company became privately held again in 1989. The focus was then switched from singles to families.

A brand extension, which features the TGI Fridays concept combined with the atmosphere of a sports bar, called "Fridays Front Row Sports Grill", is found at two Major League Baseball stadiums which each overlook the playing field: Chase Field in Phoenix, Arizona and Miller Park in Milwaukee.

Historically, the chain's highest grossing location is at Haymarket Leicester Square, which opened in 1992 in Central London. The Haymarket branch is also regarded as the "most popular" branch as well as the most successful financially. In October 2009, Haymarket broke the world record for biggest profit made in any week, throughout TGI Fridays' history, and it has been home to several past winners from the bartenders Olympics, a contest started by Scoggin.

On May 20, 2014, TGI Fridays was resold to Sentinel Capital Partners and TriArtisan Capital Partners. In October 2019, TriArtisan bought out Sentinel's remaining stake.

Controversy

In 2013, as part of "Operation Swill", investigators in New Jersey raided 17 TGI Fridays franchised restaurants owned by The Briad Group. They found that the bars were replacing premium brand alcoholic beverages with lower-cost brands yet charging patrons for the more expensive liquor.

During the 2022 Russian invasion of Ukraine, TGI Fridays refused to join the international community and withdraw from the Russian market. Research from Yale University updated on April 28, 2022, identifying how companies were reacting to Russia's invasion identified TGI Fridays in the  category of "Digging In", meaning Defying Demands for Exit: companies defying demands for exit/reduction of activities. TGI Fridays did, however, condemn the invasion and all proceeds from the franchises are being donated to Mercy Chefs, an organisation supporting humanitarian efforts in Ukraine.

Franchises

TGI Fridays is a franchising operation, with franchisees owning most of the outlets. The largest franchisee is The Briad Group in New Jersey. Whitbread PLC was a major international franchisee. Up until 2007, Whitbread had 45 locations in the UK. On January 17, 2007, Whitbread sold operating rights of all 45 restaurants back to T.G.I. Fridays UK Limited (a consortium consisting of Carlson Restaurants Worldwide Inc. and ABN Amro Capital) thus exiting a partnership formed in 1986. TGI Fridays has also been used as a restaurant for hotels run by Country Inns & Suites by Carlson brand. In 2014 the investment trust Electra Private Equity bought Fridays British subsidiary with 66 sites across the UK. In 2021 Electra spun off its hospitality business ″Hostmore Plc″, which owns Fridays in the UK.

List of countries with TGI Fridays

Africa

Americas

Asia

Europe

Oceania

Planned markets

Design

The newer TGI Fridays franchises (as well as redesigned restaurants) are more contemporary, with wallpaper, granite exteriors, and red-and-white striped lamps instead of Tiffany. The exteriors have stucco, the entrance doors have "F"-shaped handles, and a metal cup above the door has a stripe saying "In Here, It's always Friday". The logo design was evolved in 2013 by Jane MacDowall and her creative team in Scotland. Most TGI Fridays have a propeller and a rowing scull on display as part of their antiques, which are actually a part of a story told to all TGI Fridays employees; the scull always contains a pair of saddle shoes and a bottle of champagne to remind employees of the value of teamwork, leadership, and celebrating success. The propeller is always above or near the bar. The thought is that the bar "propels" the restaurant.

Menu 
Fridays has a large menu with an emphasis on alcoholic beverages. These drink come in liquid as well as frozen form and TGI often runs specials or creates unique drinks based on seasonality and location.

TGI Fridays formerly served Atkins-approved appetizers, entrées, and desserts. In 2006, the Atkins name was removed from the menu, but the restaurant continues to offer both low-carbohydrate and low-fat menu items. The UK and US menus offer gluten-free items.

See also
 List of casual dining restaurant chains
 List of restaurants in New York City

Notes

References

External links

 

1965 establishments in New York City
1975 mergers and acquisitions
2014 mergers and acquisitions
Companies based in Carrollton, Texas
Former Carlson (company) subsidiaries
Heinz brands
Multinational restaurant chains
Restaurant chains in Ireland
Restaurant chains in the United States
Restaurant franchises
Restaurants established in 1965
Restaurants in New York City